The Rough-head sea catfish (Arius latiscutatus), also known as the marine catfish is a species of sea catfish in the family Ariidae. It was described by Albert Günther in 1864. It inhabits tropical marine and brackish waters in the eastern Atlantic region, including Angola, Senegal, and Bioko.

The rough-head sea catfish is of commercial interest to fisheries.

References

Arius (fish)
Taxa named by Albert Günther
Fish described in 1864
Taxobox binomials not recognized by IUCN